The Barberton groundsel 
or succulent bush senecio (Senecio barbertonicus Klatt) is an evergreen succulent shrub of the family Asteraceae and genus Senecio, native to Southern Africa, named after one of its native localities Barberton and is now also being cultivated elsewhere for its drought resistance, clusters of sweetly scented, golden-yellow, tufted flower heads in winter and attractiveness to butterflies, the painted lady butterfly (Vanessa cardui) in particular.

Description 

Senecio barbertonicus is hardy to at least .

Distribution 

It is locally common in protected areas in eastern, central, and southwestern Eswatini
in Gauteng, KwaZulu-Natal, Limpopo, Mpumalanga and North-West.

References

Further reading 

Wild Flowers of KwaZulu-Natal - Elsa Pooley (Natal Flora Trust, Durban 1998) 

barbertonicus
Flora of South Africa